Julie Halard-Decugis and Corina Morariu were the defending champions but only Morariu competed that year with Ai Sugiyama.

Morariu and Sugiyama lost in the quarterfinals to Galina Fokina and Stéphanie Foretz.

María José Martínez and Anabel Medina Garrigues won in the final 7–5, 6–4 against Nadia Petrova and Tina Pisnik.

Seeds
Champion seeds are indicated in bold text while text in italics indicates the round in which those seeds were eliminated.

 Corina Morariu /  Ai Sugiyama (quarterfinals)
 Tina Križan /  Katarina Srebotnik (semifinals)
 María José Martínez /  Anabel Medina Garrigues (champions)
 Nathalie Dechy /  Virginie Razzano (quarterfinals)

Draw

References
 2001 Croatian Bol Ladies Open Doubles Draw

Croatian Bol Ladies Open
2001 WTA Tour